Cerdedo is a former municipality in Galicia, Spain in the province of Pontevedra.

Location
Located in the region known as Tabeirós - Terra de Montes, bordered to the north by Forcarei and A Estrada, to the west by Cotobade (with which it has since been amalgamated) and Campo Lameiro and to the east by Forcarei.

Demography

The population in 2012 was 1,916.

Civil parishes
The municipality is composed of 8 parishes:
 Castro (Santa Baia)
 Cerdedo (San Xoán)
 Figueiroa (San Martiño)
 Folgoso (Santa María)
 Parada (San Pedro)
 Pedre (Santo Estevo)
 Quireza (San Tomé)
 Tomonde (Santa María)

Municipalities in the Province of Pontevedra